K-208 was a  state highway in the U.S. state of Kansas. K-208's southern terminus was at K-4 in Valley Falls and the northern terminus was at K-16 in Valley Falls. K-208 was first designated as a state highway in 1961, from K-4 to K-16. Then in 1967, K-208 was decommissioned and became locally maintained.

History
K-208 was first designated as a state highway on July 12, 1961, to a highway connecting K-4 to K-16. In an April 21, 1967 resolution, K-4 and K-16 were realigned in and around Valley Falls to make way for the new Perry Reservoir. Also at this time K-208 was decommissioned as a state highway.

Major intersections

References

External links

Kansas Department of Transportation State Map
KDOT: Historic State Maps

208
State highways in the United States shorter than one mile